Festival Nacional del Cabrito (National Kids Festival) is a three-day festival taking place annually in late February, in Recreo, Catamarca Province, Argentina. It one of the largest festivals in the area.

The festival started in 1972. The festival is home to a fair, many crafts, and the annual voting of queens.

See also
 Recreo City

Recurring events established in 1972
Cultural festivals in Argentina
Tourist attractions in Catamarca Province
Fairs in Argentina
Summer events in Argentina